Thomas Anthony Hollander (born 25 August 1967) is an English actor. As a child Hollander trained with the National Youth Theatre and was later involved in stage productions as a member of the Footlights and was president of the Marlowe Society. He later gained success for his roles on stage and screen, winning a BAFTA Award and a Screen Actors Guild Award, as well as nominations for a Tony Award and Olivier Award. 

He began his career in theatre, winning the Ian Charleson Award in 1992 for his performance as Witwoud in The Way of the World at the Lyric Hammersmith Theatre. He made his Broadway debut in David Hare's The Judas Kiss in 1998. He appeared as Henry Carr in a revival of Tom Stoppard's play Travesties, earning nominations for the Olivier Award for Best Actor and Tony Award for Best Actor in a Play. 

Hollander gained attention for portraying Mr. Collins in Joe Wright's Pride & Prejudice (2005) and as Lord Cutler Beckett in the Pirates of the Caribbean franchise. Other film roles include in Gosford Park (2001), Elizabeth: The Golden Age (2007), Valkyrie (2008), In the Loop (2009), Hanna (2011), About Time (2013), The Invisible Woman (2013), Mission: Impossible – Rogue Nation (2015), and Bohemian Rhapsody (2018).

He's also known for his television roles including as the lead role in the BBC sitcom Rev. (2010–2014) which he co-wrote for which he received the BAFTA Award for best sitcom in 2011. For his role in the BBC series The Night Manager he won the BAFTA Award for Best Supporting Actor. He portrayed King George V in BBC's The Lost Prince (2001), and King George III in HBO miniseries John Adams (2008) and also starred in ITV's Doctor Thorne, and HBO's The White Lotus (2022). He voices Alfred Pennyworth in the animated series Harley Quinn (2020–present).

Early life
Hollander was born in Bristol and was raised in Oxford. Hollander's father is a Czech Jew whose family converted to Catholicism, and his mother is English; Hollander was brought up as a Christian. The family background was academic and musical – his grandfather, Hans Hollander, was a musicologist who wrote books about the composer Janáček. Hollander's parents were teachers, his father running the science department at a prestigious school in Oxford. He attended the Dragon School and then Abingdon School, where he was chief chorister. As a youngster, he was a member of the National Youth Theatre and the National Youth Music Theatre (then known as the Children's Music Theatre). In 1981, at the age of 14, he won the lead role in a BBC dramatisation of Leon Garfield's John Diamond.

Hollander read English at Selwyn College, Cambridge. He was actively involved in stage productions as a member of the Footlights and was president of the Marlowe Society. Sam Mendes, a friend and fellow student, directed him in several plays while they were at Cambridge, including a critically acclaimed production of Cyrano de Bergerac (which also featured future Deputy Prime Minister Nick Clegg).

Career

Film and television work
Hollander's film and television appearances include Absolutely Fabulous, Martha, Meet Frank, Daniel and Laurence, Wives and Daughters, Harry, Cambridge Spies for which he received the FIPA D'OR Grand prize for best actor, Gosford Park, The Lost Prince and Pride & Prejudice for which he received the Evening Standard Film Awards Comedy Award, and London Critics Circle Best Supporting Actor. He has worked repeatedly with Michael Gambon and Bill Nighy and is a good friend of James Purefoy. Although highly respected as a character actor and the recipient of several awards, many of his films will still play on his height (5' 5" / 165 cm). Hollander has created several memorable comedic characters that draw more on his physical energy and intensity than his height, such as the "brilliantly foul-mouthed" Leon in BBC Two's Freezing, described in The Times as a "braying swirl of ego and mania".

Hollander portrayed Lord Cutler Beckett, the "heavy" in Pirates of the Caribbean: Dead Man's Chest and Pirates of the Caribbean: At World's End.  He also appeared in the TNT miniseries The Company as Kim Philby, having previously played Guy Burgess in the BBC's Cambridge Spies.  He returned to the stage in 2007 with the premiere of Joe Penhall's play Landscape with Weapon at the Royal National Theatre. In 2008 he made a notable cameo appearance as King George III in the HBO mini-series John Adams, and ended the year as a memorable Colonel Heinz Brandt in Valkyrie.

In 2009, Hollander played a symphonic cellist in Joe Wright's movie The Soloist, his second film with Wright, who cast him to great effect as the fevered suitor Mr. Collins in 2005's Pride and Prejudice. He has worked once more with Wright, portraying a memorably flamboyant and menacing villain in Hanna (2011). Hollander appeared in a lead role in Armando Iannucci's In the Loop as Secretary of State for International Development Simon Foster MP. Hollander later made a surprise appearance (in a different role) at the end of the third series of The Thick of It, the programme on which In the Loop was based.

In 2010, Hollander and writer James Wood co-created the TV series Rev., a sensitive comedy about the all-too-human vicar of an inner-city parish. Reviews called it intelligent, realistic and very funny. Hollander played the sympathetic title character, Rev. Adam Smallbone. The show won a BAFTA in 2011 for Best Situation Comedy, among other awards and recognition. A second series aired in the UK on BBC 2 in 2011 and a third series in 2014. He has been praised for his role as the "inebriated and endearing, menacing and beguiling" chemist, Dr George Cholmondeley, appearing in five episodes of the BBC / FX 2017 series Taboo with one commenter describing him as "giving a masterclass on how to create dimension and personality, even with limited screen time."

Hollander played Queen's second manager Jim Beach in the biopic Bohemian Rhapsody, which was released in November 2018. Upon the firing of director Bryan Singer from the film in December 2017, it was reported Hollander had previously left the film due to issues with Singer; he was ultimately convinced to continue, though whether this was due to Singer's exit is unknown. Also in 2018, Hollander played Tabaqui, a hyena in Andy Serkis' motion capture film Mowgli: Legend of the Jungle.

Theatre
Hollander won the 1992 Ian Charleson Award for his performance as Witwoud in The Way of the World at the Lyric Hammersmith Theatre. He had been nominated and commended the previous year for his Celia in an all-male production of As You Like It for Cheek by Jowl and was again nominated and commended for his Khlestakov in The Government Inspector  at the Almeida Theatre in 1997. He had also received a special commendation for his 1996 performance of the title role in Tartuffe at the Almeida Theatre. In all, Hollander has been the most frequent Ian Charleson Award honoree, with four appearances at the awards: one win, two commendations and one special commendation.

In 2010, Hollander returned to the live stage in a demanding comedic dual role in Georges Feydeau's A Flea in Her Ear at the Old Vic.  Playing both master and servant with "lightning physical precision and shockingly true confusion", Hollander's was called "a virtuoso performance". Between September and November 2016 he starred as (a "career-best") Henry Carr in Patrick Marber's "superb revival" of Tom Stoppard's Travesties at the Menier Chocolate Factory. The play (with the same cast) transferred to the Apollo Theatre in February 2017 and was nominated for five Olivier Awards including Best Actor (Hollander) and Best Revival (Travesties). Marber's revival transferred to Broadway in 2018, with Hollander reprising his leading role as Carr. The play opened on 24 April 2018 (previews 29 March) at the Roundabout Theatre Company's American Airlines Theater in New York. Hollander received a Tony Award nomination for the production.

In 2022, Hollander returned to the Almeida Theatre to play the lead role of Boris Berezovsky in the inaugural run of Patriots, a play by Peter Morgan about the late Russian oligarch's life.

Voice work
Hollander has undertaken a number of voice roles for BBC radio including Mosca in 2004's Volpone for Radio 3, Frank Churchill in Jane Austen's Emma and as Mr Gently Benevolent in the pilot of the Dickensian parody Bleak Expectations for Radio 4, although he did not take part in the full series. He has voiced a young Joseph Merrick, the "Elephant Man", a disembodied head named Enzio in an urban gothic comedy and Leon Theremin, the Russian inventor famous for the electronic instrument that bears his name. He provided the vocal texture for Anthony Burgess' A Clockwork Orange recently with a "smooth, almost lyrical, crisp voice" that accomplished the task of rendering the extensive and unique slang of the book instantly understandable to readers. More recent readings include The Casual Vacancy by J. K. Rowling. In 2015 (repeated in April 2017) he played Patrick Moore in the BBC radio play Far Side of the Moore about the astronomer and his Sky at Night TV programme. In May 2016 he portrayed Geoff Cathcart in Andy Mulligan's four-part play School Drama on BBC Radio 4 which was chosen by The Guardian as that week's best radio and he narrated Peter Bradshaw's short story Reunion, broadcast on Radio 4 in October 2016. He has also portrayed the Russian artist Kazimir Malevich in Margy Kinmonth's documentary Revolution: New Art for a New World which was released in the UK and Ireland in November 2016.

Writing
Since 2008, he has written an occasional diary-style column for The Spectator, and a lifestyle article in the Times which received very positive reader comments.

Charity work
Hollander has contributed his running and cycling efforts to several charitable causes, including running to raise funds for the Childline Crisis Hotline in 2006 and in 2007, for the Teenage Cancer Trust. He is a long-time supporter of the Helen & Douglas House Hospice for Children and Young Adults in Oxford, which provides hospice care for children. He continues to support charitable organisations by contributing readings and other appearances throughout the year.

Hollander is a patron of the British Independent Film Awards and has supported the efforts of the Old Vic's "24 Hour Plays New Voices" Gala, which forwards the cause of young writers for the British stage. In August 2014, he was one of 200 public figures who were signatories to a letter to The Guardian opposing Scottish independence in the run-up to September's referendum on that issue.

Personal life
Hollander's sister is director, writer and singer Julia Hollander. The siblings, and their father Tony Hollander, presented a BBC Radio 3 documentary in 2020, exploring the story of how Tony and his parents escaped from the imminent Nazi occupation of Czechoslovakia in 1938. A letter from a BBC radio sound engineer saved his father's life.

Hollander has lived in the same flat in Notting Hill, London, since 2000. In 2010 he became engaged to the designer Fran Hickman, but they ended their relationship.

At the 2019 general election he campaigned in Kensington for Sam Gyimah of the Liberal Democrats.

In January 2016, he became an Honorary Fellow of Selwyn College, Cambridge.

Filmography

Film

Television

Theatre

Video games

Awards and nominations

See also
 List of Old Abingdonians

References

External links

1967 births
Living people
20th-century English male actors
21st-century English male actors
English Ashkenazi Jews
Alumni of Selwyn College, Cambridge
Audiobook narrators
Best Supporting Actor BAFTA Award (television) winners
English male film actors
English male musical theatre actors
English male stage actors
English male television actors
English male video game actors
English male voice actors
English people of Czech-Jewish descent
Honorary Fellows of Selwyn College, Cambridge
Ian Charleson Award winners
Male actors from Bristol
Male actors from Oxfordshire
National Youth Theatre members
Outstanding Performance by a Cast in a Motion Picture Screen Actors Guild Award winners
People educated at The Dragon School
People educated at Abingdon School
People from Notting Hill
Actors from Oxford